BYF could refer to:

 Broughty Ferry railway station, Scotland; National Rail station code BYF
 Boston Youth Fund, providing employment